Jennison is a surname. Notable people with the surname include:

Abraham Jennison (born 1804), a convict transported to Western Australia
Charles R. Jennison (1834–1884), hero of the anti-slavery faction during the Bleeding Kansas Affair and  Union colonel during the American Civil War
Jennison Heaton (1904–1971), American bobsled and skeleton racer who competed in the late 1920s
Jennison Myrie-Williams (born 1988), English footballer who plays as a winger
Martin Jennison, former association football player who represented New Zealand at international level
Melissa Jennison (born 1982), athlete from Australia
Ray Jennison, player in the National Football League
Roger Clifton Jennison (1922–2006), radio astronomer at Jodrell Bank under the guidance of Robert Hanbury Brown
Silas H. Jennison (1791–1849), American Whig politician

See also
Commonwealth of Massachusetts v. Nathaniel Jennison, decisive court case in Massachusetts in 1783 which effectively abolished slavery in that state
Joshua Jennison House, historic house at 11 Thornton Street in the Newton Corner village of Newton, Massachusetts